Ellison High School is a 6A public high school in the city of Killeen, Bell County, Texas for grades 9-12. It is one of four high schools in the Killeen Independent School District. Ellison High School opened in 1978 and the first graduation class was held in 1979.  The Ellison High School football program received a donation of US$25,000 from the American television channel NBC and automobile maker Toyota, for their participation in the  Friday Night Lights Hometown Sweepstakes contest. The former University of Kentucky head basketball coach, Billy Gillispie, was the head coach at Ellison in the early 1990s, leading the school to the 5A state basketball tournament in 1993.  In 2011, the school was rated "Academically Acceptable" by the Texas Education Agency.

Academics

Available AP Coursework
Currently, the following Advanced Placement (AP) exams are available to the students:

Calculus AB
Microeconomics
English language & Composition
English literature & Composition
Government & Politics: U.S.
Music Theory
Physics B
Psychology
Spanish language
U.S. History
World History
French Language

Notable alumni

Terry Ray - American and Canadian football player for Atlanta Falcons, New England Patriots, Edmonton Eskimos, and Winnipeg Blue Bombers
 Tommie Harris - American football player for the NFL's San Diego ChargersChicago Bears
 Donald Ray Sellers - American former football player
 Amerie - R&B singer
 Ted Gibson - American hairstylist on TLC's What Not to Wear
 Othello Henderson - Former New Orleans Saint
 Zack Wright - Basketball player
 Fred House -  Basketball player
 David Cobb (American football) - Football player

References

External links
 Killeen Independent School District
 Eduhound schools on the web

High schools in Bell County, Texas
Killeen Independent School District high schools
1978 establishments in Texas